Yakhan-e ‘Ulyā is a village in Ghor Province, in central Afghanistan. Alternate spellings of the name include Yakhān-e ‘Olyā, Yakhān-i-Bāla, and Yakhani-Ulia.

See also
Ghōr Province

References

Populated places in Ghor Province